is a stable of sumo wrestlers, one of the Takasago group of stables. It is correctly written in Japanese as "髙砂部屋", but the first of these kanji is rare, and is more commonly written as "高砂部屋".

History
Takasago stable has produced many successful wrestlers, including six yokozuna and the first non-Japanese ōzeki, American Konishiki, as well as the 33rd Kimura Shōnosuke, the tate-gyōji or chief referee.

In February 2002, the stable merged with Wakamatsu stable, with Wakamatsu's coach, former ōzeki Asashio, taking over. Future yokozuna Asashōryū was among the wrestlers transferring over. The demotion of Asasekiryū to the makushita division for the January 2017 tournament saw the stable without any sekitori for the first time since 1878. However, at the end of that tournament Asanoyama earned promotion to the jūryō division, ensuring sekitori representation once again from March. As of January 2023, it had 25 wrestlers. The former Asasekiryū took over from the former Asashio as head coach of the stable in November 2020.

In June 2021, ōzeki Asanoyama was handed a one-year (six tournament) suspension for violating sumo protocols related to COVID-19. The following month, Takasago Oyakata, Asanoyama and six lower-ranked rikishi in the stable all tested positive for COVID-19.

People

Ring name conventions
Most wrestlers since the mid 1990s and all since 2003 at this stable have quickly taken ring names or shikona that begin with the character 朝 (read: asa), meaning morning, in deference to their head coach, the former Asashio, as well as many of his predecessors who had the same shikona in their active years. For example, the wrestler formerly known as Tamaki changed his shikona to Asagyokusei when he was promoted to jūryō in July 2019.

Owners
2020–present: 8th Takasago (former sekiwake Asasekiryū)
2002-2020: 7th Takasago (former ōzeki Asashio Tarō IV)
1988-2002: 6th Takasago (former komusubi Fujinishiki Takemitsu)
1971-1988: 5th Takasago (the 46th yokozuna Asashio Tarō III)
1942-1971: 4th Takasago (the 39th yokozuna Maedayama Eigorō)
1915-1941: 3rd Takasago (former ōzeki Asashio Tarō II)
1900-1914: 2nd Takasago (former sekiwake Takamiyama)
1871-1900: 1st Takasago (former maegashira Takasago)

Notable active wrestlers

Asanoyama (best rank ōzeki)
Asabenkei (best rank  jūryō)
Asagyokusei (best rank  jūryō)
 (best rank  jūryō)
 (best rank  jūryō)

Coaches
Wakamatsu Takehito (iin, former maegashira Asanowaka)

Assistant
Iyozakura (wakaimonogashira, former jūryō, real name Masayuki Ichiki)

Notable former members
Nishinoumi Kajirō I (the 16th yokozuna)
Konishiki Yasokichi I (the 17th yokozuna)
Maedayama Eigorō (the 39th yokozuna)
Azumafuji Kin'ichi (the 40th yokozuna)
Asashio Tarō III (the 46th yokozuna)
Asashōryū Akinori (the 68th yokozuna)
Maenoyama Tarō (former ozeki)
Asashio Tarō II (former ōzeki)
Asashio Tarō IV (former ōzeki)
Konishiki Yasokichi II (former ōzeki)
Tachihikari Denemon (former ōzeki) 
Takamiyama Daigorō (former sekiwake)
Asasekiryū (former sekiwake)
Mitoizumi (former sekiwake)
Fujizakura (former sekiwake)
33rd Kimura Shōnosuke (given name Yōichi Nozawa; former chief referee)

Referees
Kimura Asanosuke (makuuchi gyōji, real name Katsuya Ishida)
Kimura Satoshi  (makushita gyōji, real name Satoshi Maeda)

Ushers
Rikinojō (makuuchi yobidashi, real name Riki Tsuchida)
Kunio (jūryō yobidashi, real name Kunio Maekawa)

Hairdressers
Tokoyumi (1st class tokoyama)

Location and access
The stable is located in Tokyo, Sumida ward, Honjo 3-5-4. It is a 10 minute walk from Honjo-azumabashi Station on the Toei Asakusa Line.

See also
List of sumo stables
List of active sumo wrestlers
List of past sumo wrestlers
Glossary of sumo terms

References

External links
Official site (Japanese)
Japan Sumo Association profile
Article on Takasago stable

Active sumo stables